Edward Martin Kingsbury (born in Grafton, Massachusetts on July 6, 1854; died 23 January 1946) was a journalist and reviewer who won a Pulitzer Prize for Editorial Writing.

Life and career 
He had originally studied law at Harvard Law School and passed the bar in 1878, but never practiced. In 1880 he went to New York City where he would work at The New York Sun from the 1880s to 1910s. In 1915 he joined the editorial department of The New York Times. He won the 1926 Pulitzer Prize for Editorial Writing for "The House of a Hundred Sorrows".

References 

1854 births
1946 deaths
The New York Times Pulitzer Prize winners
Pulitzer Prize for Editorial Writing winners
Harvard Law School alumni